Mark Fotheringham may refer to:

 Mark Fotheringham (Australian footballer) (born 1957), former Australian rules footballer with Yarraville and Williamstown
 Mark Fotheringham (Scottish footballer) (born 1983), Scottish association football manager and former player

See also
Fotheringham